Trängens IP  is a football stadium in Örebro, Sweden  and the home stadium for the football team BK Forward. Trängens IP has a total capacity of 4,700 spectators. When BK played a qualification match to the second-highest division in Sweden, the match took place on Behrn Arena in front of 2,643 spectators.

References 

Football venues in Sweden